Stanley Burnshaw (June 20, 1906 – September 16, 2005) was an American poet, primarily known for his ontology The Seamless Web (1970). His style was particularly writing political poems, prose, editorials, etc. Aside from political poetry, Burnshaw is known for his works on social justice.

Family life

Raised by his parents, who immigrated from England, Stanley Burnshaw was born and brought up in New York City. There are few detailed depictions of his childhood, but in his later years Burnshaw wrote two poems giving light on that time period of his life. The first was a poem entitled "My Friend, My Father" which was about his childhood from the viewpoint of his father, and the second about his mother entitled "House in St. Petersburg". Burnshaw married Susan Copen Oken. Burnshaw had daughter, Valeri Razavi, and later became the grandparents to one grandson.

Education

Burnshaw began his secondary education at the University of Pittsburgh, transferred to Columbia University, and then transferred back to the University of Pittsburgh again to earn his bachelor's degree. After saving up money, Burnshaw traveled to Europe in 1927 to attend the University of Poitiers and eventually Sorbonne University. Then in 1928, he returned to New York to attend graduate school at New York University and earned his Master's degree.

Career

Burnshaw made a career plan to become a teacher and a writer. To save money and get started in his future career, Burnshaw started working at the Blaw-Knox Steel Corporation in Blawnox, Pennsylvania as an assistant copywriter. After he returned from Europe, Burnshaw began working at the Hecht Company in New York City as an advertising manager. Resigning from the Hecht Company in 1932, his next job was doing multiple duties (co-editor, drama critic, and occasional book reviewer) for The New Masses, a weekly editorial in New York City.  In the 1930s Burnshaw got more interested in publishing. He first became the editor-in-chief for the Cordon Company in New York, then president and editor-in-chief of the Dryden Press (a firm he started) which merged with Holt, Rinehart and Winston in the late 1950s. Until 1968 Burnshaw was a consultant to the house and vice-president  of Dryden Press. He published many prose, poems, books, editorials, and remained active in many other aspects of his career until his death in September 2005.

Works
Early and Late Testament (1952)
Early and Late Testament
Time of Brightness
Bread
The Iron Lands
Do I Know Their Names?
For a Workers' Road-Song
All Day the Chill...
Will You Remake These Worlds?
A Coil of Glass
Anchorage in Time
This War Is Love
Hero Statues
Dialogue of the Heartbeat
The Bridge
Heartbeat Obbligato
End of the Flower-World
Looking for Papa
Among Trees of Light
Coasts of Darkness
In Strength of Singleness
Blood
It Was Never This Quiet...
When Was It Lost?
Woodpecker
Voices in Dearness...
Song Aspires to Silence
Anchorage in Time
Two Men Fell in the Irish Sea
Poetry: The Art
Odes and Lyrics
To a Young Girl Sleeping
Innocence
Wave
Event in a Field
The Fear
Light Outlives All Shape
Midnight: Deserted Pavements
Random Pieces of a Man
Waiting in Winter
Outcast of the Waters
Restful Ground
Days
Driving Song
Willowy Wind
The Hollow River
Anonymous Alba: En un vergier soiz folha d'albespi
Orléans: Le temps a laissié...
Spire: Nudités
Spire: Ce n'est pas toi...
Spire: Nativité
Spire: Un parfum éternel...
Spire: Baisers
Spire: Friselis
Spire: Volupté
Caged in an Animal's Mind (1963)
Thoughts about a Garden
Historical Song of Then and Now
Summer
Ravel and Bind
Caged in an Animal's Mind
Ancient of Nights
Symbol Curse
The Valley Between
Thoughts about a Garden
Petitioner Dogs
Father-Stones
Night of the Canyon Sun
A Recurring Vision
Midnight Wind to the Tossed
The Axe of Eden
Listen:
Random Pieces of a Man
8Thoughts of the War and My Daughter
A River
Surface
Preparation for Self-Portrait in Black Stone
Mornings of St. Croix
Boy over a Stream
Letter from One Who Could Not Cross the Frontier
Voyage: Journal Entry
Nightmare in a Workshop
Seven
Clay
A Rose Song
Guide's Speech on a Road near Delphi
Song of Nothings: In the Mountain's Shadow at Delphi
I Think among Blank Walls
Seedling Air
Three in Throes
Modes of Belief
House in St. Petersburg
Time Is a Double Line
Akhmatova: The Muse
George: Denk nicht zu viel...
Éluard: L'Amoureuse
Von Hofmannsthal: Eigene Sprache
Alberti: El ángel bueno
In the Terrified Radiance (1972)
The Terrified Radiance
The Terrified Radiance
To a Crow
Innocent War
Gulls...
Central Park: Midwinter
The Finding Light
Erstwhile Hunter
Their Singing River (I)
Not to Bereave...
Underbreathing Song
Emptiness...
Procreations
Women and Men
Movie Poster on a Subway Wall
End of a Visit
The Echoing Shape
Summer Morning Train to the City
Women and Men
Terah
Isaac
Talmudist
What Plato Was
Song of Succession
En l'an...
Dialogue of the Stone Other
In the Coastal Cities
Will of Choice
Chanson Innocente
The Rock
Condor Festival
Three Friends
We Brought You Away As Before...
Friend across the Ocean
Wildness
The Hero of Silence
Dedication: An Eternity of Words
Master and Pupils
Soliloquy from a Window: Man and Flowers
Dialogue before Waking
Fume
Into the Blond Torrent
The Waking
Second-Hand Poems
Paz: Más allá del amor
Spire: Retour des Martinets
Alberti: Canción del ángel sin suerte
Alberti: El ángel mentiroso
Verhaeren: La Bêche
Akhmatova: from "The White Flock"
Unamuno: Me destierro...
Mirages: Travel Notes in the Promised Land (1977)
First Landscape
Generations of Terror
Blind Tale
Seventh-day Mirage
The Rock
Talmudist
Marching Song
Choices
Message to Someone Four Hundred Nights Away
The House Hollow
Argon
Florida Seaside
Old Enough at Last to Be Unsolemn
Mind, If You Mourn at All
To Wake Each Dawn
Their Singing River (II)
Speech, the Thinking-Miracle
Man on a Greensward
Social Poems of the Depression (from The New Masses and The Iron Land [1936])
The Crane-Driver
Street Song: New Style
I, Jim Rogers
Mr. Tubbe's Morning Service
Notes on the Poems
Selected Prose
My Friend, My Father
Stevens' "Mr. Burnshaw and the Statue"
The Poem Itself: "Discussing Poems into English"
Thomas Mann Translates "Tonio Kröger"
A Future for Poetry: Planetary Maturity
The Seamless Web
Toward the "Knowable" Frost

References

Sources
 "Stanley Burnshaw: An Inventory of His Papers at the Harry Ransom Humanities Research Center." The WATCH File: Writers, Artists and Their Copyright Holders. Web. 22 Sept. 2011. <http://research.hrc.utexas.edu:8080/hrcxtf/view?docId=ead/00022.xml>.
 Burnshaw, Stanley. "Table of Contents and Excerpt, Burnshaw, The Collected Poems and Selected Prose." Home | The University of Texas at Austin. Web. 22 Sept. 2011. <http://www.utexas.edu/utpress/excerpts/exburcol.html>.
 Martin, Douglas. "Stanley Burnshaw; Man of Letters, Friend of Poet Robert Frost | The San Diego Union-Tribune." San Diego News, Local, California and National News - SignOnSanDiego.com. Web. 22 Sept. 2011. <http://www.signonsandiego.com/uniontrib/20050925/news_mz1j25burnsh.html>.
 "UGA Press View Book." UGA Press Home Page. Web. 22 Sept. 2011. <http://www.ugapress.org/index.php/books/stanley_burnshaw>.
 Martin, Douglas. "Stanley Burnshaw, Poet, Editor and Critic, Dies at 99" The New York Times. 17 Sept. 2005. 19 June 2022. <https://web.archive.org/web/20121113025345/http://www.nytimes.com/2005/09/17/arts/17burnshaw.html?_r=5&>.

American male poets
1906 births
2005 deaths
20th-century American poets
Cornell University alumni
20th-century American male writers